Mary Murphy may refer to:

Mary Murphy (actress) (1931–2011), American actress
Mary Murphy (basketball) (born 1957), American basketball analyst
Mary Murphy (choreographer) (born 1958), American choreographer, reality TV show judge
Mary Murphy (politician) (born 1940), American politician and member of the Minnesota House of Representatives
Mary Murphy (news personality), American television personality, print journalist and author
Mary Travers Murphy (born 1958), Executive Director of the Family Justice Center of Erie County
Mary Murphy Mine, Chaffee County, Colorado